Abdul Karim bey Mirza Mustafa bey oghlu Mehmandarov (2 December 1854, Shusha–20 December 1929, Shusha) was a Russian Empire and Soviet medical doctor of Azerbaijani ethnicity. He was one of the first ethnic Azerbaijanis to graduate from the Medico-Surgical Academy in St. Petersburg, one of the leaders of the Shusha educational society "Neshr Maarif", founder of the first Russian-Azerbaijani Shusha school for girls.

Early life 
He was born in 1854 in Shusha, as a member of the Azerbaijani noble family Mehmandarovs. His father Mirza Mustafa was an Imperial Russian officer, while his grandfather Mirza Ali was a mehmandar (an official courier appointed to escort an important traveller) of Ibrahim Khalil Khan, the origin of the surname. He graduated from Baku Gymnasium (1872) and St. Petersburg Medical-Surgical Academy (1877), then worked in a military hospital during Russo-Turkish War (1877–1878) and combated diphtheria outbreak in Poltava Guberniya. He later served in 162nd Akhaltsikhe regiment as a doctor.  Having returned to Azerbaijan in 1883, he continued his practice.

Political activities 
He was elected to head Shusha local committee of "Difai" - a secret Azerbaijani organization. Several Russian officers were assassinated under his commands - Shusha prosecutor Lunyakin, Elizabethpol police chief Bannikov and Tartar police chief Felikinski were all killed under his orders. He died in 1929 in Shusha.

Family 
He married had an affair with a Petersburger woman named Alexandra Dolganova who by then studied at the Women's Medical Courses with whom he had a son who would grow to be the famous doctor - Mikhail Tushinsky. He officially was married to Zarri Qajar (1864-1943), a daughter of Bahman Mirza in 1884 with whom he had 3 sons and 4 daughters:

 Adil beg Mehmandarov (1885-1937) - engineer and teacher
 Rashid beg Mehmandarov (1885-1937) - officer at Azerbaijani army
 Surkhay beg Mehmandarov (1890-?)
 Turan Mehmandarova - married to Fatulla beg Rustambegov
 Kubra Mehmandarova - married to Bala beg Taghi-zadeh
 Nushaba Mehmandarova - married to Shahbaz beg Rustambegov
 Zahra Mehmandarova (1985-1957) - married to firstly to Azad beg Vazirov, then Jumshud beg Vazirov
 Mahbuba Mehmandarova (1902-1976) - married to Shamil Mahmudbekov

Through his daughter Mahbuba he is great-grandfather of Eldar Azizov - current Mayor of Baku, Aliya Rustambayova (1907-1942) - Azerbaijani anti-Nazi partisan and Mustafa Mehmandarov (b.1992) - Azerbaijani musician.

Legacy 
The Central Hospital and a street in Shusha, Azerbaijan are named after him.

References

People from Shusha
1854 births
1929 deaths
Azerbaijani nobility
Azerbaijani physicians
Recipients of the Order of Saint Stanislaus (Russian)
Recipients of the Order of St. Anna, 3rd class
Recipients of the Order of St. Vladimir
Soviet military doctors
Physicians from the Russian Empire
Soviet Azerbaijani people
Recipients of the Order of St. Anna, 2nd class